The Hunters Point Avenue station is a station on the IRT Flushing Line of the New York City Subway. Located at 49th Avenue (formerly Hunters Point Avenue) and 21st Street in the intersections of Hunters Point and Long Island City, Queens, it is served by the  train at all times and the <7> train during rush hours in the peak direction.

History 
The Flushing Line was extended one stop from Vernon–Jackson Avenues to Hunters Point Avenue on February 15, 1916.

The city government took over the IRT's operations on June 12, 1940. The IRT routes were given numbered designations in 1948 with the introduction of "R-type" rolling stock, which contained rollsigns with numbered designations for each service. The route from Times Square to Flushing became known as the 7. In 1949, the New York City Board of Transportation announced that the Flushing Line platforms would be lengthened to 11 IRT car lengths; the platforms were only able to fit nine 51-foot-long IRT cars beforehand. The platforms at the station were extended in 1955–1956 to accommodate 11-car trains. However, nine-car trains continued to run on the 7 route until 1962, when they were extended to ten cars.

Station layout 

This station is the easternmost (railroad north) underground station on the Flushing Line until the northbound terminal station (Flushing – Main Street). The tunnel portal is at the eastern end of the station. Just outside the portal is a diamond crossover linking the two tracks.

This station has two tracks and two side platforms. Its architecture is in an Italianate design of brown color. Tilework includes a trimline with "HP" tiles on it and name tablets reading "HUNTERS POINT AVE." in gold serif font. The platform columns also have a trim line with "HP" tiles below them.

Exits

This station has one fare control area above the platforms and tracks near the north end. Two staircases from each platform go up to a waiting area/crossover, where a turnstile bank and several exit–only turnstiles provide access to and from the station. Outside fare control, there is a token booth and one staircase going up to the north side of 49th Avenue with 21st Street several hundred yards to the west. Two other staircases to the east go up to the north side of the same street and is near the Long Island Rail Road's Hunterspoint Avenue station.

On October 29, 1982, a public hearing was scheduled concerning the planned closure of the entrance leading to the southeast corner of 49th Avenue and 21st Street as part of the New York City Transit Authority's Station Modernization Program.

References

External links 
 
 
 Station Reporter — 7 Train
 The Subway Nut — Hunters Point Avenue Pictures
 Hunters Point Avenue entrance from Google Maps Street View
 Platforms from Google Maps Street View

IRT Flushing Line stations
New York City Subway stations in Queens, New York
Railway stations in the United States opened in 1916
1916 establishments in New York City
Long Island City